Havana is a city in Montgomery County, Kansas, United States.  As of the 2020 census, the population of the city was 84.

History
Havana was founded about 1870, when a general store was built there. It was named after Havana, Illinois. The first post office in Havana was established in 1871.

Havana experienced growth in 1886 when the Atchison, Topeka and Santa Fe Railway was extended to that point. It incorporated as a city in 1910.

Geography
Havana is located at  (37.091159, -95.941876).

Demographics

2010 census
As of the census of 2010, there were 104 people, 47 households, and 30 families residing in the city. The racial makeup of the city was 93.3% White, 2.9% Native American, and 3.8% from two or more races.

There were 47 households, of which 19.1% had children under the age of 18 living with them, 53.2% were married couples living together, 10.6% had a male householder with no wife present, and 36.2% were non-families. 29.8% of all households were made up of individuals, and 19.1% had someone living alone who was 65 years of age or older. The average household size was 2.21 and the average family size was 2.73.

The median age in the city was 50 years. 14.4% of residents were under the age of 18; 8.7% were between the ages of 18 and 24; 20.2% were from 25 to 44; 32.6% were from 45 to 64; and 24% were 65 years of age or older. The gender makeup of the city was 50.0% male and 50.0% female.

2000 census
As of the census of 2000, there were 86 people, 42 households, and 25 families residing in the city. The racial makeup of the city was 90.70% White, 4.65% Native American, and 4.65% from two or more races.

There were 42 households, out of which 19.0% had children under the age of 18 living with them, 45.2% were married couples living together, 14.3% had a female householder with no husband present, and 38.1% were non-families. 35.7% of all households were made up of individuals, and 11.9% had someone living alone who was 65 years of age or older. The average household size was 2.05 and the average family size was 2.62.

In the city, the population was spread out, with 18.6% under the age of 18, 5.8% from 18 to 24, 24.4% from 25 to 44, 34.9% from 45 to 64, and 16.3% who were 65 years of age or older. The median age was 46 years. For every 100 females, there were 115.0 males. For every 100 females age 18 and over, there were 100.0 males.

The median income for a household in the city was $30,625, and the median income for a family was $34,107. Males had a median income of $25,313 versus $17,083 for females. The per capita income for the city was $14,996. There were no families and 6.7% of the population living below the poverty line, including 8.3% of under eighteens and 19.2% of those over 64.

Education
The community is served by Caney Valley USD 436 public school district.

References

Further reading

External links
 Havana - Directory of Public Officials
 Havana city map, KDOT

Cities in Kansas
Cities in Montgomery County, Kansas
1870 establishments in Kansas
Populated places established in 1870